The Argentine Naval Prefecture ( or PNA) is a service of Argentina's Security Ministry charged with protecting the country's rivers and maritime territory. It therefore fulfills the functions of other countries' coast guards, and furthermore acts as a gendarmerie force policing navigable rivers.

According to the Argentine Constitution, the Armed Forces of the Argentine Republic cannot intervene in internal civil conflicts, so the Prefecture is defined as a civilian "security force of a military nature". It maintains a functional relationship with the Ministry of Defense, as part of both the National Defense System and the Interior Security System. It therefore maintains capabilities arising from the demands required by joint military planning with the armed forces.

The PNA is a large organization for a coastguard. With a strength of 45,750 sworn members, the PNA is a larger organization than most national navies, and is in fact slightly larger than the Argentine Navy – the organization upon which it had been attached for a long time until the 1980s, when it was transferred to direct control of the Ministry of Defense.

History

Creation
The Prefecture's predecessor is the ports service founded by the first autonomous Argentine government in June 1810, six years before Argentina declared independence. In Argentina this is considered the official founding date of the PNA. The first commander of the force was Colonel Martín Jacobo Thompson, a Porteño of partially English descent who had served against the British in the invasions of 1806–7. Thompson was given the title of "Captain of Ports" ("").

Although the PNA traces itself back to its predecessor of 1806, the modern Prefecture was in fact founded in the late nineteenth century as the "National Maritime Prefecture" on the initiative of Manuel Florencio Mantilla, a well-known Argentine senator who was also a respected academic and intellectual. The law pertaining to it was enacted in October 1896.

Falklands War
The Prefecture had a minor role in the Falklands War. As with other Argentine military services, participation in this conflict is given considerable weight in the institutional memory of the service.

Two PNA patrol vessels, Islas Malvinas (GC-82) and Rio Iguazu (GC-83), were sent to provide an Argentine coastguard service to the islands. According to Argentine sources, Rio Iguazu came into contact with a British Sea Harrier aircraft on 21 May and one member of the vessel's crew was killed while firing a 12.7 mm machine gun at the British jet. The ship ran aground, but most of its cargo -among them two 105 mm howitzers- was recovered later.

The crew of the patrol boat claimed the shooting down of the aircraft, but this was later proved to be unfounded. The sortie was actually carried out by two Sea Harriers of 800 Naval Air Squadron, Nº XZ460 and XZ499, which strafed the vessel with 30 mm cannon fire.

Illegal fishing
The Prefecture is constantly battling illegal fishing vessels in the Argentine exclusive economic zone (EEZ), mostly from eastern countries. The Argentine Naval Aviation also collaborates in detection of such ships with their CASA 212 S68 and Beechcraft 350ER' maritime surveillance aircraft.

Chian-der 3 incident

The sinking of Chian-der 3 was an incident which occurred on 28 May 1986 when the Taiwanese flag naval trawler Chian-der 3 was detected, tracked, shot, set on fire and finally sunk by the PNA. The sinking was carried out by PNA vessel Prefecto Derbes. Two Taiwanese fishermen were killed; four others were injured. The Taiwanese fishermen's union called the incident a "barbaric act" and the British government condemned it as "unjustifiable and excessive".

Organization

Headquarters

The PNA is subordinate to the Ministry of Security. The organization is headed by the National Naval Prefect (Prefecto Nacional Naval), currently Prefect-General Carlos Edgardo Fernandez, assisted by the Deputy National Naval Prefect (Subprefecto Nacional Naval), currently Prefect-General Ricardo Rodriguez.

The Prefecture's main facility is located in the Edificio Guardacostas (which translates as "the Coastguard Building") at 235 E. Madero Avenue, Buenos Aires.

The PNA headquarters is divided into three main departments, each headed by a Director-General with the rank of Prefecto General. These are each divided into a number of directorates, each headed by a Director with the rank of Prefect-General (Prefecto General).

The Intelligence Service (Servicio de Inteligencia) is directly responsible to the National Naval Prefect and is also headed by a Prefect-General.

Dirección General de Seguridad (Directorate-General of Security)
Dirección de Operaciones (Directorate of Operations)
Dirección de Policía de Seguridad de la Navegación (Directorate of Navigation Security Police)
Dirección de Policía Judicial, Protección Marítima y Puertos (Directorate of Judicial Police, Maritime Protection and Ports)
Dirección de Protección Ambiental (Directorate of Environmental Protection)
Dirección General de Logística (Directorate-General of Logistics)
Dirección de Personal (Directorate of Personnel)
Dirección de Material (Directorate of Materiel)
Dirección de Educación (Directorate of Education)
Dirección de Administración Financiera (Directorate of Financial Administration)
Dirección de Bienestar (Directorate of Welfare)
Dirección General de Planeamiento y Desarrollo (Directorate-General of Planning and Development)
Dirección de Planeamiento (Directorate of Planning)
Secretaría General (Secretariat-General; headed by the Secretary-General, a Prefecto Mayor)

Regions
The PNA is divided into ten zones:
 Alto Paraná (prefectures of Posadas, Iguazú, San Javier, Itá Ibaté, Ituzaingó, Libertador General San Martín, and Eldorado)
 Alto Uruguay
 Paraná Superior and Paraguay (prefectures of Corrientes, Formosa, Barranqueras, Pilcomayo, Reconquista, Goya, and Paso de la Patria e Itatí)
 Lower Uruguay (prefectures of Concepción del Uruguay, Gualeguaychú, Colón, Concordia, Salto Grande, and Federación)
 Lower Paraná
 Delta
 Río de la Plata
 North Argentine Sea
 South Argentine Sea
 Lacustre and Comahu

Ranks 

The highest rank of the service, Prefect-General, is held by both the National Naval Prefect and Deputy National Naval Prefect, as well as by many of the most senior officers of the prefecture, such as the heads of the different directorates of the national headquarters. While the rank itself equals that of Rear Admiral in the Argentine Navy, the National Naval Prefect and the Deputy National Naval Prefect titles are both equated to the ranks of Admiral and Vice Admiral, respectively, and wear corresponding insignia.

Officer ranks are as follows:

The non-commissioned officer and enlisted ranks of the Prefecture are as follows:

Inventory

Main ships

Patrol vessels
The Argentine Naval Prefecture use the following ships for patrol purposes.

  (Halcón II class): 1,000 tons with helicopter deck built by Bazan (Ferrol), Spain
 GC-24 
 GC-25 
 GC-26 
 GC-27 
 GC-28 
 GC-13 , 700-ton patrol vessel
 Z-28 class: 81 tons built by Blohm + Voss, Germany
 GC-64 to GC-83: Last two lost in Falklands War(GC-82 and 83)
 GC-64 Mar del Plata
 GC-65 Martin Garcia
 GC-66 Rio Lujan
 GC-67 Río Uruguay
 GC-68 Rio Paraguay
 GC-69 Río Paraná
 GC-70 Río de la Plata GC-71 La Plata  GC-72 Buenos Aires GC-73 Cabo Corrientes GC-74 Quequén GC-75 Bahía Blanca GC-76 Ingeniero White GC-77 Golfo San Matías GC-78 Madryn GC-79 Río Deseado GC-80 Ushuaia GC-81 Canal Beagle GC-82 Islas Malvinas GC-83 Rio Iguazu Stan Tender 2200 class: 61 tons built by Damen, Netherlands
 GC-122, 123, 124, 125, 129, 130, 150, 151
 Stan Tender 1750 class: 55 tons built by Damen, Netherlands
 GC-118, 119, 133
 Damen Alucat 1050 class: 15 tons built by Damen, Netherlands
 GC-137, 138, 139, 143, 144, 145, 146, 147, 148, 149
 Shaldag-class patrol boat MK II
 GC-195 Guaraní GC-196 Mataco GC-197 Timbu GC-198 TobaAt least other 50 vessels on the 8–15-ton range.

Other vessels
 PNA Dr. Bernardo Houssay (MOV1):  Ketch rigged sail training and research vessel named for Dr Bernardo Houssay. She was originally built for Woods Hole Oceanographic Institution by Burmeister & Wain in 1930. She was acquired by CONICET in 1966 and was transferred to PNA in 1996. 
 SB-15 Tango: salvage cutter. Former  research/survey ship Seismic Surveyor (IMO 7048128), built 1969 in United States and purchased in 2005.
 DF-19 Recalada: former  Shell Argentina oil tanker Estrella Atlantica ex-Humberto Beghin, built 1982 in Argentina and purchased in 2011. Converting in Buenos Aires to a pilot boarding station. Tanker Estrella Austral'' will be similarly converted to pilot boarding station DF-20.

Aircraft

Former aircraft
Previous aircraft operated by the Coast Guard were the Aérospatiale Puma, Hughes 369, Bell 47J, and the Sikorsky H-5.

Firearms

See also
Argentine Federal Police
Argentine National Gendarmerie
Buenos Aires Provincial Police
Santa Fe Provincial Police
Interior Security System
Sinking of the Chian-der 3

References

External links

 
International Lifeboat Federation 
Article Un guardacostas argentino hunde un pesquero de Taiwan en aguas reclamadas por Buenos Aires in Spanish newspaper El País on 30. May 1986 about bombardment and sinking of a Taiwan trawler by the Argentine Naval Prefecture 
Argentinian Coast Guard Helicopters

 
Military of Argentina
Coast guards
Sea rescue organizations
Military units and formations established in 1810
1810 establishments in Argentina
Maritime law enforcement agencies